CECA may refer to:

 Ceca (singer) (born 1973), a Serbian singer
 Confederación Española de Cajas de Ahorros, the Spanish Confederation of Savings Banks
 Civil Engineering Contractors Association, a membership association for civil engineering contractors in the UK
 the French, Portuguese, Italian and Spanish acronym for the European Coal and Steel Community
 Ceca, plural of cecum
 Comprehensive Economic Cooperation Agreement
 the Comprehensive Economic Cooperation Agreement between India and Singapore
 Ceca Foundation, a healthcare non-profit in the US